Sinasi Bozatli (born 1962) born in Ankara painter, sculptor and graphic artist.

He is a member of IG Bildende Kunst and IAA / UNESCO. Studied painting and sculpture on Gazi University in Ankara (1984) and painting and graphics at the University of Applied Arts Vienna. He lives and works in Vienna since 1987. He owns a studio in Long Island since 1998, and partly works in the US.

Solo exhibitions (selection)
 Atlanta – USA, Gallery Beverly K. Libby
 Cape Town – South Africa, Gallery Seeff Trust
 New York - USA Gallery Bixler
 Washington, D.C. USA, Austrian Cultural Forum
 Istanbul Sur Gallery- 8. International Artfair Istanbul, Gallery Ares, Gallery MEB - 6. International Artfair Istanbul, Sabanci Art Center, 1000 Jahre Österreich", Vakko Gallery
 Ankara – Turkey MI-GE Gallery, Zon Gallery, Artium Gallery, Halk Sanat Galerisi, Galerie Sanat-Yapim
 Vienna : Galerie Sur, AT&P, Palais Eschenbach, Alte Schmiede – Kunstverein Vienna, Galerie G&N, ICC-Hofburg, Galerie Ziwna at Palais Harrach, Galerie Mitte
 Perchtoldsdorf Lions Club Vienna-Laudon
 Eisenstadt Galerie 1990
 Wr. Neustadt Galerie Impact; Gumpoldskirchen Bergerhaus
 Eskisehir - Turkey University of Anatolia "1000 Jahre Österreich"
 Balikesir – Turkey Museum of Fine Arts "1000 Jahre Österreich"
 Bursa - Turkey Tayyare Cultural Center "1000 Jahre Österreich"
 2004 National Museum Cotroceni Bucharest, Romania "Good Morning Balkan"
 2004 St. Anna Kapelle Vienna, Austria, "Colours of Life"
 2004 EPD Gallery Prague City Center Prague, Czech Republic - November 2004
 2005 Galerie Ziwna at Palais Harrach 1010 Vienna
 2009 Studio opening 1040 Vienna

Group exhibitions
 Torremolinos - Spain "Un dialogo Espanol-Austriaco" - Centro Cultural Pablo Ruiz Picasso
 Cairo, Egypt Opera; Seoul, Corea "Prefestival" - Kepco Plaza Gallery
 Seoul, Corea 2002 Flag Art Festival - Friedenspark
 Atlanta - Georgia, USA Gallery Beverly K. Libby
 New York - USA Gallery Bixler
 Stroudsburg - Pennsylvania, USA Gallery Bixler
 Cape Town – South Africa Gallery Seef Trust
 Istanbul - Turkey Gallery Baraz
 Sofia, Bulgaria "Beyond Boundaries - Sur de Vienne" National Gallery for Foreign Arts
 Vienna - Austria West - Östlicher Diwan – Galerie MUSA
 Festival der Kulturen - Hallamasch Vienna – Galerie Sur
 Galerie Sur in Haus Wittgenstein
 Mobiles Caritas Hospiz - Palais Dorotheum
 Achammer Tritthart & Partner
 Kunst im Eisenhof
 Galerie Station 3
 Wasserturm
 Galerie Ziwna
 Eisenstadt Galerie 1990
 Wr. Neustadt Galerie Impact
 Salzburg 2002 - 2003 International Artfair Salzburg

Public purchase
 Museum of Modern Art, Ankara;
 Federal Chancellery of the Republic of Austria;
 City of Vienna;
 Lower Austria Government;
 Republic of Turkey Ministry of Culture

External links
 Official website
 Artziwna gallery

Living people
Turkish painters
1962 births
Turkish male sculptors
People from Ankara
Gazi University alumni
University of Vienna alumni
Turkish expatriates in Austria